HappyNews.com is a news aggregator and website that reports only the positive side of the news. It was created by Byron Reese, who was the founder and CEO of PageWise.

In 2016, Reese re-purchased HappyNews.com with unknown intentions.

See also
Daryn Kagan
GoodNewsNetwork
Positive News
Yes! (U.S. magazine)

References

External links
 HappyNews.com site
 The Silver Lining  Byron Reese, the publisher of HappyNews, interviewed on NPR's "On the Media"

American news websites
News aggregators
Aggregation websites